The 1987 Arizona State Sun Devils football team was an American football team that represented Arizona State University in the Pacific-10 Conference (Pac-10) during the 1987 NCAA Division I-A football season. In their third season under head coach John Cooper, the Sun Devils compiled a 7–4–1 record (3–3–1 against Pac-10 opponents), finished in fourth place in the Pac-10, and outscored their opponents by a combined total of 334 to 263.

The team's statistical leaders included Daniel Ford with 1,756 passing yards, Darryl Harris with 948 rushing yards, and Aaron Cox with 870 receiving yards.

Schedule

Roster

References

Arizona State
Arizona State Sun Devils football seasons
Freedom Bowl champion seasons
Arizona State Sun Devils football